Mowmenabad may refer to:

Fars Province
Mowmenabad, Fars, a village in Sarvestan County

Kerman Province
Mowmenabad, Bardsir, a village in Bardsir County
Mowmenabad, Narmashir, a village in Narmashir County

Lorestan Province
Mowmenabad, Delfan
Mowmenabad, Selseleh
Rumeshteh Mowmenabad

Mazandaran Province
Mowmenabad, Mazandaran, a village in Babol County

Qom Province
Mowmenabad, Qom

Razavi Khorasan Province
Momenabad, Chenaran, a village in Chenaran County
Mowmenabad, Kalat, a village in Kalat County
Momenabad, Torbat-e Jam, a village in Torbat-e Jam County

Semnan Province
Mowmenabad, Damghan
Mowmenabad, Sorkheh

South Khorasan Province
Ghasem Abad Momen Abad
Nowzad Momen Abad

Yazd Province
Mowmenabad, Yazd, a village in Bafq County

See also
Momenabad
Mu'minobod, Tajikistan